Actia maksymovi is a species of tachinid flies in the genus Actia of the family Tachinidae.

References

Muscomorph flies of Europe
maksymovi
Insects described in 1952